John Albert McMahon (born 25 October 1965) is an English former footballer who played as a forward in the Football League on a non-contract basis for Darlington. He was an apprentice with Middlesbrough, and also played non-league football for Guisborough Town.

McMahon joined Darlington in March 1985 and made four substitute appearances without scoring as the club were promoted from the Fourth Division. He started three Associated Members Cup matches; in the first round second leg, he scored a hat-trick as Darlington beat Halifax Town 7–0 to overturn a 4–1 deficit from the first leg.

References

1965 births
Living people
Footballers from Middlesbrough
English footballers
Association football forwards
Middlesbrough F.C. players
Darlington F.C. players
Guisborough Town F.C. players
English Football League players